The Botswana Movement for Democracy (BMD) is an opposition political party in Botswana established in 2010 by MPs and other politicians who split from the ruling Botswana Democratic Party over differences with Ian Khama, the BDP's leader and President of Botswana.

It was the first party to split from the BDP, which has ruled Botswana since independence in 1966. Its original leader was Gomolemo Motswaledi, elected on May 2, 2011 at the party's inaugural congress. Botsalo Ntuane,  currently MP for Gaborone West South constituency and the Leader of the Opposition in Parliament, was elected as party Vice President. Sydney Pilane, who had been serving as the party's Public Relation's Officer since its formation, lost his bid for Party President to Motswaledi.

According to the Preamble of the Constitution of the BMD, the party was founded "to defend and advance the rights of the peoples of Botswana during and in order to interrupt and reverse the progressive destruction of their independence and the  creation  of  what,  by  most  accounts,  threatens  to  be  an authoritarian government". The document goes on to stress that is aims to remove the current "undemocratic" government of Botswana "through constitutional and democratic means" with the aim of restoring and promoting "a united, non-racial, non-sexist and democratic Botswana."

Electoral history

National Assembly elections

References

External links
Official website

Political parties in Botswana
Liberal parties in Africa
Political parties established in 2010
2010 establishments in Botswana